Børge Thorup (born 4 October 1943) is a Danish former international football player, who played as a defender.

His career spanned from 1962 to 1974 and he both started and ended his career, at a time when the Danish league was amateur-only, with Brønshøj Boldklub. Between 1966 and 1973 he took his game abroad and played professionally for Morton (2 spells), Crystal Palace and Clydebank.

Thorup signed for Crystal Palace in March 1969, but having made only one appearance (as a substitute) in December, returned to Morton before the end of the season.

Børge Thorup was capped once, in 1965, in a match against Greece. Prior to that he played 11 matches for the U21-national team.

References

External links

Thorup at holmesdale.net

1943 births
Living people
Footballers from Copenhagen
Association football defenders
Brønshøj Boldklub players
Crystal Palace F.C. players
Greenock Morton F.C. players
Clydebank F.C. (1965) players
Danish expatriate sportspeople in England
Danish expatriate sportspeople in Scotland
Denmark international footballers
Denmark under-21 international footballers
Expatriate footballers in England
Expatriate footballers in Scotland
Danish men's footballers
Danish expatriate men's footballers
English Football League players